Karaoke Challenge is a game show that originally aired on Challenge TV in 1997.  It was hosted by a variety of hosts.

External links

1990s British game shows
1997 British television series debuts
1997 British television series endings